Southern Columbia Area School District is a small, rural, public school district located in Catawissa, Pennsylvania. It serves communities in two counties. In Columbia County the district serves: Catawissa Borough, Catawissa Township, Locust Township, Roaring Creek Township, Franklin Township and Cleveland Township. In Northumberland County it serves Ralpho Township. According to 2000 federal census data, it serves a resident population of 9,803. By 2010, the US Census Bureau reported that the district's population increased to 10,386 people. The per capita income of residents was $18,969 in 2009, while the median family income was $45,889. In the Commonwealth, the median family income was $49,501 and the United States median family income was $49,445, in 2010. The district is one of the 500 public school districts of Pennsylvania.

According to district officials, in school year 2009–10, the Southern Columbia Area School District provided basic educational services to
1,488 pupils. The district employed: 108 teachers, 115 full-time and part-time support personnel, and 7 administrators. Southern Columbia Area School District received more than $6.6 million in state funding in school year 2009–10. Per school district officials, in school year 2007–08, the Southern Columbia Area School District provided basic educational services to 1,424 pupils through the employment of 114 teachers, 141 full-time and part-time support personnel, and 7 administrators.

Southern Columbia Area School District operates three schools: G.C. Hartman Elementary Center (Kindergarten through Fourth Grade), Southern Columbia Area Middle School (Fifth grade through Eighth Grade), and Southern Columbia Area High School serving grades nine through twelve. Both the Elementary and the Junior/Senior High Schools are accredited by the Middle States Association of Colleges and Schools and by the Pennsylvania Department of Education.

Facilities
Southern Columbia has two buildings. One is an elementary school housing kindergarten to fourth grade, built in 1971. The elementary building has a gymnasium/cafeteria.  The other is a high school housing ninth to twelfth grades built in 1961. The high school has a 2,080-seat gymnasium and a 900-seat auditorium. A middle school addition was built onto the high school in 1999. The middle/high school was renovated in 2011. The elementary school was also renovated in 2011. The middle/high school is a two-story building. The elementary is also a two-story building.

Extracurricular activities
The Southern Columbia Area School District offers a variety of clubs, activities and an extensive sports program.

Southern Columbia currently holds the Pennsylvania state record for consecutive and total state football championships, with 6 and 9 respectively.In 2022, the school district was mired in controversy after high school students displayed racist signs at a pep rally before the class AA PIAA Championship football game and two football players posted a video on TikTok after the game referencing their win over Westinghouse High School, a predominantly Black highschool in Pittsburgh, that included the n-word.

Sports
The district funds:

Boys
Baseball - AA
Basketball- AA
Cross country - A
Football - AA
Golf - AA
Soccer - A
Track and field - AA
Wrestling - AA

Girls
Basketball - AA
Cross country - A
Field hockey - AA
Golf
Soccer - A
Softball - AA
Track and field - AA

Middle school sports

Boys
Basketball
Cross country
Football
Soccer
Wrestling

Girls
Basketball
Cross country
Field hockey
Soccer 

According to PIAA directory July 2012

References

External links
 Southern Columbia Area School District
 Columbia-Montour Area Vocational-Technical School

School districts in Columbia County, Pennsylvania
School districts in Northumberland County, Pennsylvania